Occimiano is a comune (municipality) in the Province of Alessandria in the Italian region Piedmont, located about  east of Turin and about  northwest of Alessandria.  

Occimiano borders the following municipalities: Borgo San Martino, Casale Monferrato, Conzano, Giarole, Lu e Cuccaro Monferrato, Mirabello Monferrato, and Pomaro Monferrato.

References

External links
 Official website

Cities and towns in Piedmont